Domjan is a surname. Notable people with the surname include:

 Raphaël Domjan (born 1972), Swiss explorer and lecturer
 Veronika Domjan (born 1996), Slovenian discus thrower
 (1932–1972), Hungarian actress